Totalise plc v Motley Fool Ltd (2001) was the first case of Internet libel in the UK. Totalise (Totalise became part of Madasafish in 2006) sued Motley Fool because a user named "Zeddust" made negative comments about Totalise on the Motley Fool website. Motley Fool were forced to reveal the identity of Zeddust under Section 10 of the Contempt of Court Act.

References

External links
Websites forced to reveal user identity
Websites forced to identify forum posters

English defamation case law
Court of Appeal (England and Wales) cases
2001 in case law
2001 in British law
Internet case law